Navy Ground is a cricket ground in Welisara, Sri Lanka.  The first recorded match held on the ground came in 2002 when Galle Cricket Club Under-23s played Nugegoda Sports and Welfare Club Under-23s.

First-class cricket was first played there in 2006 when Burgher Recreation Club played Saracens Sports Club in the 2006/07 Premier Trophy.  To date twenty first-class matches have been held there, though home side Sri Lanka Navy Sports Club didn't start playing there until the 2009/10 season.  The first List A was held there in the 2006/07 Premier Limited Overs Tournament when Kurunegala Youth Cricket Club played Sri Lanka Army Sports Club.  To date, ten List A matches have been played there.

References

External links
Navy Ground at ESPNcricinfo
Navy Ground at CricketArchive

Cricket grounds in Sri Lanka
Buildings and structures in Western Province, Sri Lanka
Installations of the Sri Lanka Navy